Digby—Annapolis is a provincial electoral district in  Nova Scotia, Canada which existed between 1993 and 2013 and since 2021.  It elects one member of the Nova Scotia House of Assembly.  The electoral district includes the Municipality of the District of Digby, which is the northeastern half of Digby County as well as the western part of Annapolis County.

The electoral district was created in 1993 by merging sections from Annapolis East, Annapolis West and Digby.  It was abolished following the 2012 electoral boundary review and was largely replaced by the new electoral districts of Clare-Digby and Annapolis. It was re-created out of those districts following the 2019 electoral boundary review.

Geography

Members of the Legislative Assembly
The electoral district was represented by the following Members of the Legislative Assembly:

Election results

1993 general election

1998 general election

1999 general election

2003 general election

2006 general election

2009 general election

2017 general election (transposed)

2021 general election

References

External links
 riding profile
 June 13, 2006 Nova Scotia Provincial General Election Poll By Poll Results

Former provincial electoral districts of Nova Scotia